Willie Byrd is an American professional football player who is currently a free agent. He most recently played for the Saskatchewan Roughriders of the Canadian Football League (CFL).  Byrd has previously played in the CFL for the Winnipeg Blue Bombers and Calgary Stampeders, spending most of his time on special teams.  Byrd played college football at four different schools (William Penn, Garden State Community College, North Dakota State and Miles College).

References

Saskatchewan Roughriders players
1983 births
Living people
Sportspeople from Boynton Beach, Florida